Ailuropoda microta is the earliest known ancestor of the giant panda. It measured 1 m (3 ft) in length; the modern giant panda grows to a size in excess of 1.5 m (5 ft). Wear patterns on its teeth suggest it lived on a diet of bamboo, the primary food of the giant panda. The first discovered skull of the animal in a south China limestone cave is estimated to be 2 million years old. The skull found is about half the size of a modern-day giant panda, but is anatomically very similar.  This research suggests that the giant panda has evolved for more than 3 million years as a completely separate lineage from that of other bears.

References

Pliocene bears
Pliocene carnivorans
Giant pandas
Fossil taxa described in 1962
Prehistoric animals of China